John Daly (23 March 1867 – 23 February 1932) was an Irish politician, vintner and baker. He was elected to Dáil Éireann as an Independent Labour Teachta Dála (TD) for the Cork East constituency at the 1923 general election.

Daly was re-elected at the June 1927 general election. He joined the Cumann na nGaedheal party. Other former independents who joined, included Bryan Cooper and Vincent Rice, formerly National League. At the September 1927 general election he was elected as a Cumann na nGaedheal TD. He was re-elected at the 1932 general election but died one week later. No by-election was held to fill his seat.

References

1867 births
1932 deaths
Independent TDs
Cumann na nGaedheal TDs
Members of the 4th Dáil
Members of the 5th Dáil
Members of the 6th Dáil
Members of the 7th Dáil
Politicians from County Cork